Karate at the 2019 African Games was held from 24 to 26 August 2019 in Rabat, Morocco.

Participating nations

Medal table

Medal summary

Men

Women

References

External links
Result book

2019 African Games
African Games
2019 African Games
2019